West Sea Shipyard is a shipbuilding company of the Martifer Group, created in 2014 after the extinction of ENVC Shipyard. West Sea is dedicated to the construction of various types of ships, such as cruise ships and offshore patrol vessels. Since 2014 it has built more than 15 ships and repaired more than 50 ships, such as Container ships, Tankers, Platform supply vessels, Cargo ships, Reefer ships and Tugs.

Ships built and under construction

Ships built 

 VIKING OSFRID Riverboat
 SCENIC AZURE Riverboat
 NRP Sines Offshore patrol vessel
 NRP Setúbal Offshore patrol vessel
 EMERALD RADIANCE Riverboat
 DOURO ELEGANCE Riverboat
 DOURO SERENITY Riverboat
 DRAGA DE SUCÇÃO Trailing suction hopper dredger
 DOURO SPLENDOUR Riverboat
 A ROSA ALVA Riverboat
 AMADOURO Riverboat
 VIKING HELGRIM Riverboat
 SÃO GABRIEL Riverboat
 WORLD EXPLORER Cruise ship
 WORLD VOYAGER Cruise ship
 WORLD NAVIGATOR Cruise ship

Ships under construction 

 WORLD TRAVELLER Cruise ship
 WORLD SEEKER Cruise ship
 WORLD ADVENTURER Cruise ship
 WORLD DISCOVERER Cruise ship

Gallery

See also 

 ENVC Shipyard
 Martifer

References

External links 
 

Defence companies of Portugal
Shipbuilding companies
Shipyards of Portugal